Wolves in Wolves' Clothing is the tenth studio album by the American punk rock band NOFX. At 46 minutes, this is NOFX's longest studio album.

Release
In February and March 2006, NOFX embarked on  headlining US tour, with support from the Lawrence Arms and the Loved Ones. On March 20, 2006, the album's artwork and track listing was posted online; "100 Times Fuckeder" appeared on April 10, 2006. Three days later, a music video for "Seeing Double at the Triple Rock" was posted on the band's Myspace profile. Wolves in Wolves' Clothing was made available for streaming through AOL Music on April 17, 2006, being released the following day through Fat Wreck Chords. The band went on the 2006 Warped Tour, and following this, they appeared at the Flip the Switch festival in Canada. In September and October 2006, they toured across South America, and appeared at the Corona Music Fest in Mexico. Two of the planned shows had to be cancelled because of issues with the promoter; another shows was cancelled upon the arrival of riot police.

In January 2007, the band went on a tour of California alongside Strike Anywhere, Dead to Me and Love Equals Death. Following this, they toured New Zealand and Australia, then visited Japan and Taiwan in April 2007. In August and September 2007, the band toured Europe with the Mad Caddies, and then a few dates in Israel with Useless ID, Man Alive, Kill the Drive, and the Testicles. A second European leg followed by a short tour of South Africa, with support from The Loved Ones (American band)|the Loved Ones. In February and March 2008, the band appeared on the Fat Tour, alongside No Use for a Name and the Flatliners, and appeared at the South by Southwest music conference. They went on the second leg of the Fat Tour with No Use for a Name and American Steel in May 2008. Following this, they performed at the Quebec City Music Festival in Canada.

Track listing

Personnel
Credits adapted from the album's liner notes.

Band
Fat Mike – lead vocals, bass guitar, producer
El Hefe – guitar, backing vocals
Eric Melvin – guitar, backing vocals, additional engineering
Erik Sandin – drums

Production
Bill Stevenson – recording engineer, mixing engineer (tracks 1–6 and 10–19); producer (all tracks)
Jason Livermore – recording engineer (tracks 1–6 and 10–19); producer, mixing engineer, audio mastering (all tracks)
Adam Krammer – recording engineer (tracks 7–9)
Andrew Berlin – additional engineering
Jamie McMann – additional engineering

Additional credits
Erica Pedersen – translating of "Cantado en Español"
Brian Archer – artwork, layout, and design

Charts

References

External links

Wolves in Wolves' Clothing at YouTube (streamed copy where licensed)
 NOFX Album Details Revealed. Ultimate-Guitar.com. November 24, 2005.
 Fat Wreck Chords: Wolves in Wolves' Clothing
 NOFX official website

NOFX albums
2006 albums
Fat Wreck Chords albums
Albums produced by Bill Stevenson (musician)